Yun Bing (dates unknown), courtesy names Qingyu and Haoru, was a Chinese painter during the Qianlong era. She is well known for her bird-and-flower paintings executing the "boneless" technique, and became the most famed of the Yun family's female artists.

Biography
Yun was born to an artistic family in Wujin District of Changzhou, the granddaughter of the famed painter Yun Shouping. Her niece Yun Zhu was also a talented artists. Though her birth and death dates are unknown, one of her paintings in the Shanghai Museum is dated to 1750. She married Mao Hongtiao, also from Wujin, and the two sold paintings and wrote poetry to support their family. One of Yun's granddaughters, named Zhou, was recorded in the Yun family genealogy book, which has been used to suggest that her artistic skills were worthy of the Yun clan.

Art
Yun's painting style was heavily influenced by her family's preference for the "boneless" technique. She predominantly painted bird-and-flower paintings, but also painted people, one of which depicts a woman doing her hair known as the Hairpin Scroll. Yun is often compared with her contemporary Ma Quan, who similarly specialised in bird-and-flower painting but favoured strong outlines. The Chuyue jiexu wenjian lu, compiled in 1818, describes how people throughout the Jiangnan region described them as the "two without parallel"

During his tenure as governor-general of Liangjiang, Yi Jishan presented some of Yun's works to Empress Dowager Chongqing who in turn showed them to the Qianlong Emperor. The emperor was reportedly so impressed that he wrote a poem praising her art, after which Yun's reputation as a painter spread.

Gallery

References

Notes

Further reading

Year of birth unknown
Year of death unknown
18th-century Chinese painters
18th-century Chinese women
18th-century Chinese people
Chinese women painters
Qing dynasty painters
Painters from Changzhou
People from Wujin District